The 2021 CAF Women's Champions League WAFU Zone B Qualifiers is the enougural edition of the WAFU Zone B women's club football qualifier tournament organised by the WAFU for the women's clubs of association nations. This edition was held from 24 July to 5 August 2021 in Abidjan, Ivory Coast. The winners of the tournament qualified automatically for the 2021 CAF Women's Champions League final tournament, to be held in Egypt.

Participating teams

Match officials

Referees
 Yemisi Akintoye (Nigeria)  
 Nafissa Iro Sari (Niger)
 Kayodé Laurande Offin (Benin)
 Jacqueline Nikiema (Burkina Faso)
 Zomadre Kore (Ivory Coast)
 Edoh Kindedji (Togo)

Assistant Referees
 Mfon Akpan (Nigeria)
 Hawa Douno Moussa (Niger) 
 Nafissatou  Yekini Shitou (Benin) 
 Lou Prisca Danielle Ta (Ivory Coast) 
 Edwige Appia (Ivory Coast)
 Alice Farizua Chakule (Ghana)

Qualifying Tournaments

Group stage

Group 1

Group 2

Knockout stage

Semifinals

Third place match

Final

Awards and statistics

Goalscorers

Own goals

References 

2021 CAF Women's Champions League
Women's Champions League
CAF
West African Football Union competitions